67th parallel may refer to:

67th parallel north, a circle of latitude in the Northern Hemisphere
67th parallel south, a circle of latitude in the Southern Hemisphere